Dendrobium crepidatum (shoe-lipped dendrobium) is a species of orchid. It is native to southern China (Guizhou, Yunnan), the eastern Himalayas (India, Assam, Sikkim, Bhutan, Arunachal Pradesh, Nepal, Bangladesh),  and northern Indochina (Laos, Myanmar, Thailand, Vietnam).

References

External links

crepidatum
Flora of Indo-China
Flora of the Indian subcontinent
Orchids of China
Plants described in 1850
Taxa named by John Lindley
Taxa named by Joseph Paxton